The  is a contemporary art museum in Koto, Tokyo, Japan. The museum is located in Kiba Park. It was opened in 1995.

Collections 
Marilyn Monroe by Andy Warhol (1967)
Girl with Hair Ribbon by Roy Lichtenstein (1965)
Honey-pop by Tokujin Yoshioka (2001)
Water Block by Tokujin Yoshioka (2002)

Access
The closest railway station is Kiba Station on the Tokyo Metro Tozai Line.

External links
 Museum of Contemporary Art Tokyo website

Art museums established in 1995
Art museums and galleries in Tokyo
Contemporary art galleries in Japan
Buildings and structures in Koto, Tokyo
Museum of Contemporary Art Tokyo